The season 2009–10 of the Ranji Trophy began on 3 November, and will finish on 15 January with the final. In the Super League, 15 teams were divided into two groups. The top 3 teams of each group qualified for the playoffs, plus the top 2 teams from the Plate League (Haryana and Assam).

First round

Group A

Group B

Playoffs
Four top teams of the plate group league qualified for the playoffs.

* FIL – First Inning's Lead

Plate Play Offs

Quarterfinals

Semifinals

Finals

Statistics

Runs

Wickets

References

1. http://www.cricinfo.com/ranjisuperleague2009/engine/current/series/412590.html?view=pointstable

Ranji Trophy seasons
Domestic cricket competitions in 2009–10
2009 in Indian cricket
2010 in Indian cricket